Jorge Jaime Schaulsohn Brodsky (born 22 December 1952) is a Chilean politician who was President of the Chamber of Deputies of Chile and as a member of the Chamber of Deputies, representing the former District 22 of Santiago.

References

1952 births
Living people
People from Santiago
Chilean Jews
Presidents of the Chamber of Deputies of Chile
University of Chile alumni
Radical Party of Chile politicians
Party for Democracy (Chile) politicians
Chilean political commentators